Hinava is a traditional native dish of the Kadazan-Dusun people in the state of Sabah. It is made from fish and mixed with lime juice, bird's eye chili, sliced shallots and grated ginger. While the Kadazan are famous with their Hinava tongii.

See also 
 Kinilaw, a similar dish from the Philippines
 Ceviche
 List of raw fish dishes

References

External links 
 Hinava Ginapan (Kadazan-Dusun)

Malaysian cuisine
Uncooked fish dishes